Mauro Rodolfo Pittón (born 8 August 1994) is an Argentine professional footballer who plays as a defensive midfielder for Unión Santa Fe.

Career
Pittón started with Unión Santa Fe in the club's youth ranks before making the step up to first-team football in 2015, his Primera División debut came on 23 August in an away defeat against Tigre; his only appearance in the 2015 season. In 2016, Pittón made ten appearances but only three were starts. In the following season he started Unión's first eight matches in all competitions. On 15 March 2016, Pittón and his brother Bruno played together for the first time in a Primera División game against Boca Juniors. He scored his first goal two years later versus Banfield. 2019 saw Pittón make his Copa Sudamericana bow against Independiente del Valle.

On 21 June 2019, Unión Santa Fe announced that a deal in principle had been agreed with San Lorenzo for the transfer of Mauro and his brother Bruno; subject to terms and medicals. San Lorenzo confirmed the moves a day later. Mauro was sold for a fee around €1,3 million.

On 16 January 2020, Pittón was sold to Vélez Sarsfield for a fee around €1,6 millions, signing a deal until the end of June 2023. After only 10 appearances in all competitions for Vélez in his first 12 months at the club, Pittón was loaned to his former club Unión de Santa Fe in February 2021 until the end of the year. A year later, in February 2022, Pittón was loaned out to Arsenal de Sarandí.

Personal life
He is the brother of fellow footballer Bruno Pittón.

Career statistics
.

References

External links
 

1994 births
Living people
Footballers from Santa Fe, Argentina
Argentine footballers
Association football midfielders
Argentine people of Italian descent
Argentine Primera División players
Unión de Santa Fe footballers
San Lorenzo de Almagro footballers
Club Atlético Vélez Sarsfield footballers
Arsenal de Sarandí footballers